The 2009 SEAT León Eurocup was the second season of the SEAT León Eurocup, a one-make racing series supporting the World Touring Car Championship.

Hungarian Norbert Michelisz won the championship at the final round at Imola.

Teams and drivers

Race calendar and results

* The highest points scorer from each round won a prize drive in the next round of the WTCC in a SEAT León with SUNRED Engineering. Michaël Rossi will race at the first European round in 2010.

Championship standings

References

External links
 

SEAT León Eurocup seasons
SEAT Leon Eurocup
SEAT Leon Eurocup